FC Dnepr may refer to multiple association football clubs:
 FC Dnepr-DUSSh-1 Rogachev, a defunct football club from Rogachev, Belarus.
 FC Dnepr Mogilev, football club from Mogilev, Belarus.
 FC Dnepr Smolensk, football club from Smolensk, Russia.
 FC Dnipro, football club from Dnipro, Ukraine that was known as FC Dnepr Dnepropetrovsk, the Russian language spelling of the club, during the Soviet control of Ukraine.